Tavastia Castle or Häme Castle is a medieval castle in Tavastia Proper, Finland. It is located in Hämeenlinna, the city between Helsinki and Tampere. Originally located on an island, the castle now sits on the coast of lake Vanajavesi. The castle consists of a central keep and surrounding curtain walls, enclosed by a moat. The keep originally had five turrets, but only two are apparent today. The curtain wall has a gatehouse, battlements, an octagonal brick corner turret, and a round gun turret. The lower tiers of the keep and curtain wall are of masoned granite and the upper tiers are red brickwork.

Although the exact date is disputed, the castle is generally considered to have been constructed in the 13th century. In addition to its status as a military fortress and home for Swedish nobility, the castle has seen use as a prison, and is currently a museum operated by the Finnish National Board of Antiquities. The castle is one of the main tourist attractions of southern Finland, being the centerpiece of the city and a popular venue for events, including renaissance fairs.

History
The castle's age is disputed. Traditionally, the construction of the castle has been connected to Birger Jarl's Second Swedish Crusade, which would date the castle in the mid-13th century. However, there are no archeological finds from the castle that can be firmly dated to a period earlier than the 1320s. Also, the Russian Novgorod First Chronicle only mentions one castle during their plundering of Tavastia in 1311, its description also matching with the castle in Hakoinen.

In the mid-1500s, under Gustav I, the castle lost much of its military importance. Some restoration was conducted in the early 1600s, and in 1639, the castle's nearby settlements gained official city status as Hämeenlinna. The castle continued to be neglected by Swedish rule throughout the 17th and 18th centuries, as its military interests shifted to the southern Baltic sea. Tavastia Castle was briefly ceded to the Russian army during the Great Northern War, after which the castle's defensive systems were upgraded with bastions.

After the Finnish War, when Finland became the Grand Duchy of Finland under Russian rule, the castle was turned into a prison. It served as such until 1953, when massive restoration work started. The castle has been a public museum since 1979, the facilities of which can also be rented for private events.

See also 
 Aulanko Castle

References

External links 
 
 Official site: Tavastia Castle at the Finnish National Board of Antiquities
 Medieval castles in Finland, thisisFINLAND.fi
 Tavastia Castle at fortified-places.com
 The Association of Castles and Museums around the Baltic Sea

Castles in Finland
Castle
Buildings and structures in Kanta-Häme
Museums in Kanta-Häme
History of Kanta-Häme
Historic house museums in Finland
Brick Gothic
Gothic architecture in Finland